(I am going/walking around) is a Navajo song, composed in 1868 to commemorate the release of the Navajo from internment at Fort Sumner. The song's lyrics express the elation of the Navajo people on the occasion of their return to their homeland. Unlike most other Navajo songs,  is almost entirely translatable - there are few words that can not be replaced with an English word of the same meaning. Most Navajo songs are untranslatable. The word  (beauty), a major concept in Navajo spirituality, is used throughout the song.

Lyrics

References

Notes

Navajo culture
Southwestern Indian music
1868 songs
Anthems of non-sovereign states